The Cathedral Church of Our Lady of Sorrows, also known as St Mary's Cathedral or Wrexham Cathedral, is a Roman Catholic cathedral in Wrexham, Wales. It is the seat of the Bishop of Wrexham, and mother church of the Roman Catholic Diocese of Wrexham.

History
The cathedral was originally built as a parish church in 1857. Its architect, Edward Welby Pugin, adopted a 14th-century Decorated Gothic style. The church replaced an earlier chapel, located in King Street, which by the 1850s was deemed insufficient for the growing congregation, and finance was provided by a local industrialist. Further additions to satisfy a still-growing congregation were made in the mid-20th century, in the form of the cloister and side chapel.

The church was designated a pro-cathedral in 1898 upon the establishment of the Roman Catholic Diocese of Menevia. It was consecrated on 7 November 1907.

The cathedral today

Wrexham Cathedral is now a Grade II listed building.

See also
List of cathedrals in the United Kingdom

References

External links
 
 

Roman Catholic churches completed in 1857
19th-century Roman Catholic church buildings in the United Kingdom
Roman Catholic cathedrals in Wales
Wrexham
Grade II listed churches in Wrexham County Borough
Roman Catholic Diocese of Wrexham
Grade II listed cathedrals in Wales
1857 establishments in Wales
E. W. Pugin church buildings